Saandip is an Indian singer and actor. He has given playback to Tollywood and Bollywood movies. He has acted in "Premayanamaha" and "Inkosaari". He was the first South Indian to participate in the Popular TV Show ZEE SAREGAMAPA (Revived from Zee SAREGAMA) anchored by Shaan in 2003 and won many accolades from the musical geniuses of Bollywood.

Early life and education
Saandip was born to B. Swami Nath and B. Janaki Nath in Vijayawada, Andhra Pradesh. He is the younger son in the family.

He spent his childhood in Maharashtra (Wardha, Sholapur) and Madhya Pradesh (Bhopal). He attended school in Kendriya Vidyalaya until 1991, and then until 1997 in Hyderabad, up to 12th standard. He moved to Bangalore to pursue his graduation and gained a BE in Telecommunications at the Bangalore Institute of Technology from 1997 to 2000.

Saandip took to singing as a hobby during his childhood. He developed an interest in music very early in his life, while listening to his elder brother Sirish. Because of his father's railway job, he was brought up in Maharashtra (Wardha, Sholapur) and stayed in Bhopal, Madhya Pradesh from 1981 to 1991.

He moved to Hyderabad in 1991, and joined the tutelage of Dr. Shobha Raju in 1994.

TV shows
In 1998, Saandip gained recognition – and managed to precede to the final – through the Telugu show, "Padutha Teeyaga", which broadcast on ETV Telugu and was hosted by S. P. Balasubrahmanyam.

Actor
Saandip acted in Premayanamaha  –  Love is God. The song "America America" was received with widespread acclamation. More recently, he acted in the movie Inkosari, which is produced by "Bay Movies".

Anchor
He has anchored Popular Musical TV show "Sing a Song" on Maa TV and a special musical-lyrical Ugadi episode in ETV.

Movies
As an actor

2010 – Inkosaari
2003 – Premayanamaha
2015 – Tiger

Discography

References

External links
 Hindi.com
 Totaltollywood.com
 Telugupedia.com
 YouTube.com
 Thenisai.com
 Idlebrain.com
 YouTube.com
 Artistspages.org
 Cinegoer.com
 telugu.tharangamedia.com
 savvymoovy.wordpress.com

Indian male voice actors
1978 births
Living people
Indian male playback singers
Singers from Andhra Pradesh
Musicians from Vijayawada
Kendriya Vidyalaya alumni
21st-century Indian singers
Film musicians from Andhra Pradesh
21st-century Indian male singers